Television in Azerbaijan was introduced in 1956, when Azerbaijan was still known as the Azerbaijani SSR.

Azerbaijan has a total of 47 television channels, of which 4 are public television channels and 43 are private television channels of which 12 are national television channels and 31 regional television channels. According to the Ministry of Communications and Information Technologies of Azerbaijan, the television penetration rate is 99% according to 2014 data. The penetration rate of cable television in Azerbaijan totaled 28.1% of households in 2013, from a study by the State Statistical Committee of the Azerbaijan Republic. Almost 39% of the cable television subscriber base is concentrated in major cities. The penetration rate of cable television totaled 59.1% in the city of Baku in 2013.

List of channels 
This is a list of television channels that broadcast in Azerbaijan.

State-owned

Private

Nationwide

Regional

Discontinued

State-owned

Private

Most viewed channels

See also 
 Television in the Soviet Union

References

External links
 National Television and Radio Council of the Republic of Azerbaijan

 
Television
Azerbaijan